Mount Trashmore may refer to:

Mount Trashmore Park, a park in Virginia Beach, Virginia
Mount Trashmore (Illinois), a landfill site, now part of James Park in Evanston, Illinois
Mount Trashmore (Florida), a landfill site in Broward County, Florida
Mount Trashmore (Iowa), a landfill site, now a city park in Cedar Rapids, Iowa